Club Sport Marítimo is a Volleyball team based in Funchal, Madeira, Portugal. It plays in Portuguese Volleyball League A1.

Achievements
 Portuguese Volleyball League A2:1
1999/00

 

C.S. Marítimo
Portuguese volleyball teams
Sport in Madeira